Romanian Rally Championship is the annual rally series in Romania. It is organized by FRAS (Federaţia Română de Automobilism Sportiv) and sponsored by Dunlop.

Champions

Seasons

2018

2014
The 2014 season was won by the French driver François Delecour in a Peugeot 207 S2000, ahead of Romanian drivers Edwin Keleti, in a Ford Fiesta R5, and Dan Gârtofan, in a Škoda Fabia S2000.

2013
The 2013 season was won by the French driver François Delecour, in a Peugeot 207 S2000, followed by the Hungarian driver David Botka, in a Mitsubishi Lancer Evo 9 R4, and the Romanian-Italian driver Marco Tempestini, in a Skoda Fabia S2000. The calendar brought in for the first time a system where points gained in some of the rallies were increased or reduced by a specific coefficient. The Sibiu Rally was also part of the Intercontinental Rally Challenge.

2012

2011
In the 2011 championship were planned to be held 9 rallies, the same from the previous year and the new entry Raliul Moldovei. However, Raliul Argeșului was canceled three days before the start for safety reasons. Raliul Târgu Mureș, held at the start of May, was stopped at halfway stage due to unexpected snowy weather, and only half of the points were awarded. The champion at the end of the season was Valentin Porcișteanu, last year's runner-up, who had won four of the eight rallies held. Second place in the overall standings came Bogdan Marișca, while third came Dan Gârtofan. Previous year's champion Gergő Szabó finished fifth, behind Marco Tempestini fourth.

2010
In the 2010 championship were held 8 rallies. The champion at the end of the season was Gergo Szabo, ahead of Valentin Porcișteanu and Dan Gârtofan.

2009
In the 2009 championship were held eight rallies. The champion at the end of the season was Gergo Szabo, ahead of Marco Tempestini (nicknamed Tempesta) and Jarkko Miettinen.

2008
In 2008 were held eight rallies in the championship:

Classifications

2007
In 2007 were held ten rallies in the championship:

Classifications

2006
In 2006 were held eight rallies in the championship and it was one of the closest. The eventual champion at the end of the season was Constantin Aur, followed at one point distance by Claudiu David and Dan Gîrtofan.

See also
2002 Raliul Brasovului

References

External links
FRAS – Federaţia Română de Automobilism Sportiv
Autorally – News about the Romanian Rally Championship

Rally racing series
Motorsport in Romania
Rally